Shane Willan Julien (6 January 1956 – 25 January 1992) was a Grenadian cricketer whose career in top-level West Indian domestic cricket spanned from 1981 to 1987. His primary team was the Windward Islands, but he also played a single season each for Barbados and the Leeward Islands.

Early life 

Julien was born on 6 January 1992, in Point Salines, Saint George Parish, Grenada. The son of a prominent businessman, he was sent to school overseas, attending The Lodge School in Barbados and England's Trent College.

Cricket career 

During the 1977 English season, Julien played for Middlesex in the Second XI Championship. He subsequently moved to Barbados, appearing for the Wanderers Cricket Club. In April 1981, Julien was selected for Barbados in the final of the 1980–81 Geddes Grant/Harrison Line Trophy, making his List A debut. That game was his only appearance for Barbados, and he returned to Grenada shortly after, making his first-class debut for the Windward Islands in March 1982.

A right-handed middle-order batsman, Julien scored his maiden first-class century during the 1982–83 Shell Shield season, an innings of 123 against Trinidad and Tobago. His score came in the fourth innings of the match, and helped his team chase down a target of 367. At the beginning of the 1983–84 season, Julien was selected in a "Young West Indies" squad to tour Zimbabwe, playing both first-class and one-day fixtures. In the fourth and final one-day fixture, he scored what was to be his only List-A century, making 142 runs from fourth in the batting order (and putting on 213 runs for the third wicket with Timur Mohamed). Julien subsequently spent the 1983–84 domestic season with the Leeward Islands, moving to Saint Kitts. He consequently became one of the few men to play for both the Windwards and the Leewards.

Julien returned to the Windward Islands for the 1984–85 season, and remained with them for the rest of his career. He played his final matches during the 1986–87 Shell Shield season, finishing with a first-class batting average of 31.48. After finishing his cricket career, Julien concentrated on his fishing business, spending time in both Grenada and Barbados. He died in Barbados on 25 January 1992, having committed suicide by hanging.

Notes

References

External links
Player profile and statistics at CricketArchive
Player profile and statistics at ESPNcricinfo

1956 births
1992 deaths
Barbados cricketers
Grenadian cricketers
Grenadian expatriates in Barbados
Grenadian expatriates in Saint Kitts and Nevis
Grenadian expatriates in the United Kingdom
Leeward Islands cricketers
People from Saint George Parish, Grenada
Suicides by hanging in Barbados
Windward Islands cricketers
1992 suicides